Mathew Lawrence Gamel (born July 26, 1985) is an American former professional baseball first baseman. He played in Major League Baseball for the Milwaukee Brewers across the 2008 through 2012 seasons. Once considered among the best prospects in baseball, Gamel's career was limited by injuries.

Early life
Gamel attended Bishop Kenny High School in Jacksonville, Florida. He was drafted in 4th round of the 2005 Major League Baseball draft from Chipola College in Marianna, Florida.

Baseball career

Milwaukee Brewers
Gamel played his first professional season in 2005 for Milwaukee's Rookie League Helena Brewers. Gamel was promoted to the Single-A West Virginia Power in 2006 and the High Single-A Brevard County Manatees in 2007 in which he posted a 33-game hitting streak bested only by Derek Jeter. He played most of the 2008 season with the Double-A Huntsville Stars before being promoted to the Triple-A Nashville Sounds on August 24. In 2008, he was selected to play in the All-Star Futures Game.

Gamel was called up to the Majors for the first time when rosters expanded on September 1, 2008, and made his debut two days later, striking out in a pinch-hitting appearance. He recorded his first career hit, a double, on September 7, 2008, off of Chris Young of the San Diego Padres. He hit his first career home run on May 18, 2009, off of Kyle Lohse of the St. Louis Cardinals. However, he made his first fielding error at third base during the same game, even though he had made a great play just a few innings earlier. He hit his second home run off Jason Hammel of the Colorado Rockies.

On May 22, 2012, Gamel underwent surgery to repair a torn anterior cruciate ligament (ACL) and missed the rest of the 2012 season.

During 2013 Spring Training, Gamel retore his surgically repaired ACL and missed the entire 2013 season.

Chicago Cubs
On October 3, 2013, Gamel was claimed off waivers by the Chicago Cubs. On December 2, he was non-tendered by Chicago, becoming a free agent.

Atlanta Braves
On December 13, 2013, Gamel signed a minor league contract with the Atlanta Braves. However, he re-injured himself doing workouts before spring training and was released by the Braves on February 18, 2014.

New York Yankees
On March 6, 2015 it was reported that Mat signed a minor league contract with the New York Yankees. He was released on March 14, 2015.

Somerset Patriots/Camden Riversharks
He signed with the Somerset Patriots and then eventually the Camden Riversharks of the Atlantic League of Professional Baseball for the 2015 season.

Personal life
Gamel's brother, Ben, also plays in MLB for the Pittsburgh Pirates. Gamel is currently married with two children.

References

External links

"Minor League Baseball: Stats: Mat Gamel." Minor League Baseball. 2008. Retrieved on August 25, 2008.

1985 births
Living people
Milwaukee Brewers players
Helena Brewers players
West Virginia Power players
Brevard County Manatees players
Chipola Indians baseball players
Huntsville Stars players
Nashville Sounds players
Major League Baseball third basemen
Baseball players from Jacksonville, Florida
North Shore Honu players
Leones del Caracas players
American expatriate baseball players in Venezuela
Estrellas Orientales players
American expatriate baseball players in the Dominican Republic
Gigantes del Cibao players
Somerset Patriots players
Bishop Kenny High School alumni